The Guelph Gryphons are an ice hockey team that represents the University of Guelph. They compete in the Ontario University Athletics Conference in U Sports. The program has yielded seven McCaw Cup conference championships and one Golden Path Trophy national championship, coming in 2019.

History

On March 3, 2011, a postseason match between the Queen's Golden Gaels and the Guelph Gryphons became the longest collegiate hockey game, male or female, Canadian or American — on record. The match began on Wednesday and it only ended on Thursday. The duration of the match was 167 minutes and 14 seconds when Queen's forward Morgan McHaffie placed a rebound past Gryphons goalie Danielle Skoufranis.

In the 2011-12 campaign, Jackie Sollis was named an OUA First-Team All-Star. She led all defenders in the OUA with 23 points, while forward Erin Small finished second in OUA scoring with 34 points. Along with goaltender Stephanie Nehring, the two were named OUA Second Team all-stars. Freshman goaltender Nehring was one of only two goalies to reach double digits in wins with 14. Her 1.89 goals against average ranked second overall in the OUA.

Jessica Pinkerton was named to the OUA All-Rookie team, as she led all OUA rookies with 14 goals in her initial campaign. In addition, her 26 points were second overall among OUA rookies. Her nine power play goals led all scorers in the OUA, as the Gryphons enjoyed a second-place finish in the standings.

On November 17, 2015, the Guelph Gryphons were ranked No. 1 nationally for the first time in school history with a 7-2 record.

Season team scoring champion

USports Tournament results
In Progress

International

Awards and honours

Rachel Flanagan: 2021 BFL Coach of the Year Award - Provincial Winner for Ontario (High Performance Category)

OUA honours
2019 OUA Female Coach of the Year: Rachel Flanagan
2019 OUA Female Team of the Year

OUA Goaltender of the Year

OUA Most Sportsmanlike

OUA All-Stars

Second Team

OUA All-Rookie
Jessica Pinkerton, Forward: 2011-12
Amanda Parkins, Forward: 2012-13 
Christine Grant, Forward: 2012-13

USports Awards

Valerie Lamenta, 2015-16 Brodrick Trophy Winner

USports All-Canadians
Christine Grant, 2013 USports Rookie of the Year
Amanda Parkins, 2012-13 USports First Team All-Star
Valerie Lamenta, 2015-16 USports First Team All-Star
Averi Nooren, 2015-16 USports Second Team All-Star
Leigh Shilton, 2015-16 USports Second Team All-Star

University Awards
2020 Gunner Obrascovs Trainer of the Year: Rileigh Arsenault 
2019 W.F. Mitchell Sportswoman of the Year: Valerie Lamenta
2019 Gryphie of the Year (for best moment of the varsity season): Kaitlin Lowy - scoring gold medal winning goal at U Sports Nationals
2016 Guelph Gryphons Athlete of the Year: Valérie Lamenta
2016 Shirley Peterson Award (3-year Most Improved Player): Kelly Gribbons 
2015 W.F. Mitchell Sportswoman of the Year: Katie Mora

Athlete of the Week
Valerie Lamenta: Guelph Gryphons Athlete of the Week (Awarded March 4, 2019)

Team Awards

Rookie of the Year
2019-20: Hannah Tait 
2018-19: Lauren Ianni 
2017-18: Molly Crossman
2016-17: Sydney Davison 
2015-16: Claire Merrick
2014-15: Katherine Bailey

Most Valuable Player
2019-20: Karli Shell
2018-19: Claire Merrick
2017-18: Kaitlin Lowy
2016-17: Katherine Bailey 
2015-16: Valerie Lamenta and Jessica Pinkerton
2014-15: Katie Mora

Gryphons in pro hockey

References

External links

Sport in Guelph
University of Guelph
U Sports women's ice hockey teams
Women's ice hockey teams in Canada
Ice hockey teams in Ontario
Women in Ontario